Paris is a given name used as a boy and girl name. It is of Greek origin and is common among Anglophone countries.

Notable people with the name

Women
 Paris Bennett (born 1988), singer on American Idol
 Paris Berelc (born 1998), American actress and model
 Paris Grey (born 1965), American singer
 Paris Hilton (born 1981), socialite and heiress of the Hilton Worldwide multinational hospitality company
 Paris Jackson (born 1998), American actress, activist, and model
 Paris Jones (female singer) (born 1990), American singer and musician known as "PJ"
 Paris Lees (born 1987/1988), British journalist and activist
 Paris Smith (born 2000), American actress and singer
 Paris Stephens (born 1998), Australian pair skater
 Paris Wells, Australian singer-songwriter

Men
Hotman Paris Hutapea (born 1959), Indonesian lawyer
Jacques Pâris de Bollardière (1907-1986), French Army general and activist
Paris (actor under Domitian), 1st century actor in Rome
Paris Barclay (born 1956), American television director
Paris Bordone (1500–1571), Italian painter 
Paris Cotton (born 1989), American football player
Paris Davis (born 1939), United States Army officer
Paris C. Dunning (1806–1884), American politician
Paris Elia (born 1972), Cypriot footballer
Paris Ford (born 1998), American football player
Paris Gee (born 1994), Canadian soccer player
Paris Gibson (1830–1920), American entrepreneur and politician
Paris Intarakomalyasut (born 1998), Thai actor and singer
Paris Jackson (Canadian football) (born 1980), Canadian football player
Paris Johnson Jr. (born 2001), American football player
Paris Jones (male singer) (born 1990), American singer
Paris Kanellakis (1953–1995), Greek computer scientist
Paris Latsis (born 1979), Greek shipping heir
Paris Lenon (born 1977), American football player
Paris Nakajima-Farran (born 1989), Canadian soccer player
Paris Sadonis (born 1972), American musician
Paris Simmons (born 1990), English football player
Paris Singer (1867–1932), French-born American businessman
Paris Themmen (born 1959), American actor

Other
 Saint Paris (died 346), Bishop of Teano
 Peiras "Paris" Fotis-Zoubris, of Paris & Simo

Fictional characters
 Paris (mythology), a Trojan character in The Iliad and other Greek legends
 Count Paris, in William Shakespeare's play Romeo and Juliet
 Paris (Marvel Comics), a member of the Pantheon in Marvel Comics
 Paris Carver, a James Bond character
 Paris Geller, a character played by Liza Weil on the American television series Gilmore Girls
 Paris Bennett, original real name of the Marvel Comics character Exodus

See also 
 Paris (surname)
 Parys (name), given name and surname

External links 
Behind the Name: Paris

English feminine given names
English masculine given names
English unisex given names
Given names of Greek language origin
Greek masculine given names
English-language unisex given names